Balanetta amydrozona is a species of sea snail, a marine gastropod mollusc in the family Marginellidae, the margin snails.

Description

Distribution
This species is distributed in the Gulf of Oman and in the Indian Ocean along Madagascar.

References

 Dautzenberg, Ph. (1929). Mollusques testaces marins de Madagascar. Faune des Colonies Francaises, Tome III
 Cossignani T. (2006). Marginellidae & Cystiscidae of the World. L'Informatore Piceno. 408pp

Marginellidae
Gastropods described in 1906